The APL-17-class barracks ship was a class of barracks ships of the United States Navy after the start of the Second World War, in the 1940s.

Development 
Eighteen ships were built during World War II with 6 cancelled, later built as Benewah-class. Franklin D. Roosevelt approved the construction of tenders and repair ships in May 1943, it was then recommended by the Auxiliary Vessels Board on 11 June later that year, the construction of barracks ships.

The class consists of barges with a two-story barracks built on top instead of the a warehouse design, and they had an auxiliary vessel designation of "A". Moreover, on their top deck, 4 Oerlikon 20 mm cannons were placed together with 2 gun and their platforms on each side of the ship. The guns were later removed after being put into the reserve fleet in 1946.

During the Vietnam War, 4 ships (APL-21, 26, 27 and 30) were dispatched to South Vietnam, with APL-26 and 27 later transferred to South Vietnam. The two ships were captured by North Vietnam in April 1975.

Since 2011, only 3 ships have been in service at Naval Station San Diego, Mayport and Norfolk. Notably, APL-24 served as a headquarter for the Suisun Bay Reserve Fleet for the Maritime Administration, since 23 May 1962. On 7 June 1946, APL-33 became the only ship of the class to be intentionally sunk because after grounding in Okinawa, caused by a typhoon.

Ships of class

See also
Barracks ship
List of auxiliaries of the United States Navy § Barracks Craft (APL)

External links

Citations

Auxiliary ship classes
Barracks ships of the United States Navy